Nani is a town in Ghazni Province, Afghanistan. It lies along highway A01.

See also 
 Ghazni Province

Populated places in Ghazni Province